Nathaniel Thomas Hone (21 June 1861 in Monkstown, County Dublin, Ireland – 1 August 1881 in Limerick, Ireland) was an Irish cricketer who played first-class cricket for Cambridge University.

Born in Monkstown, County Dublin and educated in Dublin and at Rugby where he was an excellent horse rider and polo player, he went on to attend Trinity Hall, Cambridge. Whilst there, he played three first-class cricket matches in June 1881, playing against Lancashire and the MCC before gaining his blue against Oxford University.

However, his life would end in tragic circumstances just five weeks later. Whilst on a cricket tour of Limerick, he was feeling unwell and went into a chemist to ask for a black draught. By mistake, the assistant gave him a dose of carbolic acid and he died in great pain a few hours later.

References

1861 births
1881 deaths
Cricketers from Dublin (city)
Alumni of Trinity Hall, Cambridge
Irish cricketers
Cambridge University cricketers
Accidental deaths in Ireland